Caloptilia baringi is a moth of the family Gracillariidae. It is known from Brunei, India (Sikkim), Indonesia (Sulawesi) and Malaysia (Sabah).

References

baringi
Moths described in 1993
Moths of Asia